The Belle Ayr mine is a coal mine located 18 miles southeast of Gillette, Wyoming in the United States in the coal-rich Powder River Basin. The mine is an open pit, "truck and shovel", mine producing a low-sulfur, sub-bituminous coal from the Wyodak-Anderson seam that is used for domestic energy generation. Coal produced by the mine is shipped to its customers via railroad. The mine is owned and operated by Blackjewel LLC after being acquired from Contura energy in 2017.

As of 2009, Belle Ayr had reserves of 406 mm tons of sub-bituminous coal and a maximum permitted production capacity of 45mm tons per year. Typical annual production has been in 26-28mm ton range for the last several years though. The average quality of the coal shipped from Belle Ayr is 8,550 BTU/lb, 0.33% Sulfur, 4.50% Ash, and 1.90% Sodium (of the ash). Train loading operations at the mine are done with a batch weigh bin system that is coupled to a "weigh-in-motion" track scale system. Silo capacity at the mine's rail loop, which can accommodate up to 5 unit trains, is 46,000 tons. In 2008, the mine produced just over 28.7 million short tons of coal, making it the 7th-most productive coal mine in the United States.

History

The Belle Ayr Mine began operations in 1972 and is the oldest, non-captive mine in the Powder River Basin. Since mining operations began, the mine has shipped over 574 million tons of coal to its customers. The Belle Ayr mine has changed hands many times through mergers and sales. Previous owners include AMAX, Cyprus AMAX, RAG, and Foundation Coal.

In 2007, Belle Ayr was awarded a Director's Award from the Office of Surface Mining for its restoration work on Caballo Creek, which winds its way through the Belle Ayr Mine property.

On July 1, 2019, CEO Jeffery Hoop announced that Blackjewel LLC, the operator of Belle Ayr had filed for bankruptcy and closed the mine. According to the Casper Star-Tribune, court documents show that Blackjewel owes $500 million in liabilities, including $6 million to employees. This was after Blackjewel was denied $20 million in financing by the United Bank of West Virginia.

Production

References

Mines in Campbell County, Wyoming
Mines in Wyoming
Coal mines in the United States